Fareghan Rural District is a rural district (dehestan) in the Fareghan District of Hajjiabad County, Hormozgan Province, Iran. At the 2006 census, its population was 3,159, in 829 families.  The rural district has 14 villages.

References 

Rural Districts of Hormozgan Province
Hajjiabad County